The Type 96 15 cm cannon (Japanese: 九六式十五糎加農砲, Kyūroku-shiki jūgo-senchi Kannohō) was a siege gun used by the Imperial Japanese Army in the Japanese-Soviet War and during the Pacific War from 1936 to 1945.  The designation Type 96 indicates the year of its introduction, Kōki year 2596 or 1936 according to Gregorian calendar.

Design 
The Type 96 was a built-up gun made from steel with an interrupted-screw breech which fired separate loading cased charge and projectiles.  The barrel was trunnioned well to the rear to allow high angles of elevation and the preponderance of the barrel was supported by horizontal equilibrators.  The Type 96 also had a hydro-pneumatic recoil system located between the barrel and cradle.  All of this was supported on a two-wheeled box trail carriage.  The carriage did not have any traverse but instead sat on top of a mobile turntable which could be assembled onsite in 4–5 hours which allowed 180° of traverse.

History 
The Type 96 evolved from the earlier Type 89 15 cm cannon field gun but with a longer barrel and a heavier carriage.  Since the Japanese army had few field guns with a range in excess of  the Type 96 was developed as a siege gun.  Due to its weight  mobility was a concern and this meant that the Type 96 was more often used as a fortress gun instead of a siege gun.

Pacific War 
During the Philippines Campaign in 1942, the US-Philippine forces withdrew first to the Bataan peninsula, then to the island fortress of Corregidor.  The Type 96 first saw action on May 4, 1942, when two Type 96 guns participated in the bombardment of Corregidor.  The two cannons of the 2nd Independent Heavy Artillery Battalion, along with two Type 89 15 cm guns of the same battalion, fired a total of 3,513 rounds.  These guns were engaged mainly in a counter-battery role to neutralize the guns of the fortress.  Corregidor later fell on May 6, 1942.

Japanese-Soviet War 
Two Type 96's of the 1st Artillery Battalion of the 4th Border Guard Unit was moved to Manchuria to Kotō Fortress to strengthen the Japanese defense in preparation for a Soviet attack.  The Japanese army had eight fortresses built along the border with the Soviet Union, of which the Kotō fortress on the Ussuri River was the strongest.  Large-scale fortifications, similar to the Maginot Line, were guarded by the 4th Border Guard Unit.  The 1400-strong crew had two batteries of field guns and howitzers, the Type 90 240 mm railway gun, and the Experimental 41-cm Howitzer.  When the Red Army attacked the Japanese positions around Kotō fortress in Operation August Storm in August 1945, the crew was annihilated.

Gallery

References

External links

150 mm artillery
World War II artillery of Japan
Siege artillery
Military equipment introduced in the 1930s